Chen Wen-huei (born 23 February 1997) is a Taiwanese  weightlifter.

Early life
Chen was raised in New Taipei City.

Career
At the 2017 Asian Indoor and Martial Arts Games held in Ashgabat, Turkmenistan, Chen finished in fifth place in the women's 58kg event.

In 2019, she competed in the women's 64 kg event at the World Weightlifting Championships held in Pattaya, Thailand.

She represented Chinese Taipei at the 2020 Summer Olympics in Tokyo and she won the bronze medal in the women's 64 kg event. In December 2021, she won the silver medal in the women's 64 kg event at the World Weightlifting Championships held in Tashkent, Uzbekistan.

Achievements

References

External links
 

1997 births
Living people
Weightlifters at the 2020 Summer Olympics
Medalists at the 2020 Summer Olympics
Olympic weightlifters of Taiwan
Olympic bronze medalists for Taiwan
Taiwanese female weightlifters
Olympic medalists in weightlifting
Sportspeople from New Taipei
World Weightlifting Championships medalists
21st-century Taiwanese women